The Sulaymani branch of Tayyibi Isma'ilism is an Islamic community, of which around 70,000 members reside in Yemen, while a few thousand Sulaymani Bohras can be found in India. The Sulaymanis are sometimes headed by a Da'i al-Mutlaq from the Makrami family.

It is not correct that this branch is headed by one from the Makrami family always as the D'ai al Mutlaq could be from other families and communities. Examples: the first Da'i was Dhuayb Bin Mousa (Hamdan), Dawud Bin Ajab Shah(Indian), Sulayman Bin Al Hassan (Indian) and some of his brothers and sons were Indians. It is, however, true for the very recent Da'is have came from the Makrami family (Banu Yam), with exception of the late Da'i Abdullah bin Mohammad, who was not from the Makrami family.

History 
Founded in 1592, the Sulaymanis are mostly concentrated in Yemen but are also found in Pakistan and India. The denomination is named after its 27th Daʻī, Sulayman bin Hassan. 

The total number of Sulaymanis currently are around 300,000, mainly living in the eastern district of Jabal Haraz in northwest Yemen and in Najran, Saudi Arabia. Beside the Banu Yam of Najran, the Sulaymanis are in Haraz, among the inhabitants of the Jabal Maghariba and in Hawzan, Lahab and Attara, as well as in the district of Hamadan and in the vicinity of Yarim.

In India there are between 3000 and 5000 Sulaymanis living mainly in Vadodara, Hyderabad, Mumbai and Surat. In Punjab, Pakistan, there is a well-established Sulaymani community in Sind. Some ten thousand Sulaymanis live in rural areas of Punjab known to the Sulaymani as Jazeera-e Sind; these Sulaymani communities have been in the Jazeera-e Sind from the time of Fatimid Imam-Caliph Al-Mu'izz li-Din Allah when he sent his Daʻīs to Jazeera-e Sind.

There are also some 900–1000 Sulaymanis mainly from South Asia scattered around the world, in the Persian Gulf States, United States, Canada, Thailand, Australia, Japan and the United Kingdom. The Sulaymanis split off from the Tayyibi community, following a succession dispute upon the death of Dawood Bin Ajabshah in 1589. While most of the Tayyibis in India recognised Dawood Bin Qutubshah as his successor and thus forming the Dawoodi Bohras, the Yemeni community followed Sulayman bin Hassan. 

Starting from 1677, Sulayman's successors almost always came from the Makrami family. The da'is made Najran their headquarters and ruled the area, supported by the Banu Yam, until their power waned under the successive rules of the Ottomans and Saudis. The leadership of the Sulaymaniyah, whose Indian community was small, reverted to the Yemen with the succession of the thirtieth Da'i al-Mutlaq, Ibrahim ibn Muhammad ibn Fahd Al-Makrami, in 1677. Since then the position of the dai al mutlaq has remained in various branches of the al Makrami family except for the time of the forty-sixth dai, an Indian. 

The Makrami da'is usually resided in Badr in Najran, Saudi Arabia. With the backing of the tribe of the Banu Yam they ruled Najran independently and at times extended their sway over other parts of the Yemen and Arabia until the incorporation of Najran into Saudi Arabia in 1934. The peak of their power was in the time of the thirty-third Da'i al-Mutlaq, Isma'il ibn Hibat Allah (1747–1770), who defeated the Wahhabiyah or Wahhabism in Najd and invaded Hadramawt. He is also known as the author of an esoteric Qur'an commentary, virtually the only religious work of a Sulaymani author published so far. Since Najran came under Saudi rule, the religious activity of the da'is and their followers has been severely restricted. In the Yemen the Sulaymaniyah are found chiefly in the region of Manakha and the Haraz mountains. In India they live mainly in Baroda, Ahmadabad, and Hyderabad and are guided by a representative (mansub) of the Da'i al-Mutlaq residing in Baroda.

Sulaymani da'i al-mutlaqs 
The following is a list of religious leaders (da'i al-mutlaq) of the Sulaymani Isma'ilis. For the 26 predecessors, see List of Dai of Dawoodi Bohra.
See Sulayman bin Hassan for more information. 

 Sulayman bin Hassan
 Ali bin Sulayman
 Ibrahim bin Muhammad bin al-Fahd al-Makrami
 Muhammad bin Isma'il
 Hibat-Allah bin Ibrahim
 Isma'il bin Hibat-Allah
 Hasan bin Hibat-Allah
 Abd-al-Ali bin Hasan
 Abd-Allah bin Ali
 Yusuf bin Ali
 Husayn bin Husayn
 Isma'il bin Muhammad
 Hasan bin Muhammad
 Hasan bin Isma'il
 Ahmad bin Isma'il
 Abd-Allah bin Ali
 Ali bin Hibat-Allah
 Ali bin Muhsin
 Husam-al-Din al-Hajj Ghulam Husayn
 Sharaf-al-Din Husayn bin Ahmad al-Makrami
 Jamal-al-Din Ali bin Sharaf-al-Din Husayn al-Makrami
 Sharafi Hasan bin Husayn al-Makrami
 Husayn bin Isma'il al-Makrami
 Abdullah bin Mohammed
 Ahmed bin Ali al-Makrami

History of the Imāmī Sūlaymānīs 

{| class="navbox" style="float:center; margin: 2ex 0 0.6em 0.5em; width: 8em; line-height:111%;" 
!The schematic history of the development of the Imāmī-Mustā‘lī Sulaymanism from other Shī‘ah Muslim sects
|-    
|

See also 
Alavi Bohras
Atba-e-Malak
Atba-e-Malak Badar
Atba-e-Malak Vakil
Dawoodi Bohra
Progressive Dawoodi Bohra
Hebtiahs Bohra
Sunni Bohra
Tyabji family

Notes

Further reading 
 
 
 
 

Bohra
Shia Islam in Saudi Arabia
Shia Islam in Yemen
Social groups of Pakistan
Muslim communities of India
Muslim communities of Gujarat
 
Tayyibi Isma'ili branches